Björgvin Páll Gústavsson (born 24 May 1985) is an Icelandic handball player  that plays as a goalkeeper.

Background
Björgvin grew up in Kópavogur. He has two brothers, Axel Birgir, and Margeir Felix, and two sisters, Berglind Sif, and Helga Lind. Björgvin describes himself as sharing a very special bond with Berglind and often talks about how she inspired him.

Career
Björgvin started showing interest sports interest at the age of nine. Björgvin and his friend Steinþór Þorsteinsson started in handball with HK, a team from Kópavogur, but they transferred to Víkingur; after two years with Víkingur they returned to HK. 

He participated in the 2008 summer Olympics in Beijing as a goalkeeper for the Icelandic national handball team. He played a significant role as goalkeeper, making 75 saves in the tournament and aiding in the teams progression to the finals of the tournament. Iceland was defeated by France with a score of 28-23 in the final, finishing the tournament with Iceland's best ever result, a silver medal.

References

External links

1985 births
Living people
Bjorgvin Pall Gustavsson
Handball players at the 2008 Summer Olympics
Handball players at the 2012 Summer Olympics
Bjorgvin Pall Gustavsson
Bjorgvin Pall Gustavsson
Recipients of the Order of the Falcon
Olympic medalists in handball
Medalists at the 2008 Summer Olympics
Handball-Bundesliga players
Expatriate handball players
Bjorgvin Pall Gustavsson
Bjorgvin Pall Gustavsson
Bjorgvin Pall Gustavsson
Bjorgvin Pall Gustavsson
SC Magdeburg players